Woblitz is a river of Brandenburg, Germany. It flows into the Stolpsee, which is drained by the Havel, in Himmelpfort.

See also
List of rivers of Brandenburg

Rivers of Brandenburg
Federal waterways in Germany
 
Rivers of Germany